The history of Illinois may be defined by several broad historical periods, namely, the pre-Columbian period, the era of European exploration and colonization, its development as part of the American frontier, its early statehood period, growth in the 19th and 20th centuries, and contemporary Illinois of today.

Pre-Columbian era

Cahokia, the urban center of the pre-Columbian Mississippian culture, was located near present-day Collinsville, Illinois. Several burial mounds and adobe structures were created in Southern Illinois across the Mississippi River  from St. Louis. A gigantic mound, known as Monks Mound near Cahokia, is about the same height from its base as the Pyramid of Giza. Built around 1050 AD by an immense marshaling of human labor, this huge earth-work faced the site of a palisaded city that contained more than one hundred small artificial mounds marking burial sites. This Mississippi valley city of Cahokia is estimated to have had a population of about 16000 to 20000, the most concentrated population north of the Rio Grande until the late 1700s. Radiating out from Cahokia for many miles were tilled fields that supplied the corn for the urban dwellers. That civilization vanished circa 1400–1500 for unknown reasons. A severe earthquake that damaged Monk's Mound at that time might have challenged the supernatural powers claimed by the Cahokian chiefs. Cahokians might have also outstripped their water supply caused in part by large-scale deforestation, and the period of global cooling or mini Ice Age of the era might have caused recurring famines and migration.

The next major power in the region was the Illiniwek Confederation, a political alliance among several tribes. The Illiniwek gave Illinois its name. The Ho-Chunk, a Siouan people of the Chiwere subgroup & the alleged oldest continuous Siouan society, were also believed to claim some land north of the  Rock River. During the Beaver Wars period of the 17th century, the Iroquois pushed through and briefly conquered Ohio, Indiana & Southern Michigan, forcing several peoples out of those regions. Several migrating groups of Miami & Mascouten—the oldest known inhabitants of Indiana & S. Michigan—spread throughout the western Great Lakes & Upper Mississippi region, living wherever they could. The known tribes were the Miami, Mascouten, Wea, Atchatchakangouen, Pepicokia, Mengakonkia, Pinakashaw & Kilatika. The Beaver Wars also caused a secondary conflict in the greater Wisconsin area known as the Second Fauk War, which pushed the ancestors of the Lakota/ Dakota out onto the plains & destabilized the Dakotas.

The French, who arrived during the 1670s–80s and established the Illinois colony, helped to stabilize the region. The Miami & Mascouten subtribes merged back into two—the Miami & Wea-- & returned to the east in the 1690s. In the aftermath of the Yamasee War (1715–1717) in the early 18th century, the French also offered aid to a breakaway group of Yuchi known as the Chisca, who had once resided in southeast Kentucky and had them migrate into Illiniwek territory. During the French & Indian War, English influence spread deep into and destabilized the Illinois Colony. The largely Algonquian-ized Chisca split away and returned to Kentucky, taking several of the Illiniwek peoples with them (although, some remained) and became known as the Kispoko. The Kispoko soon after merged with the Shawnee. Later, the remaining Illiniwek were pushed out onto the Great Plains, alike many other tribes and were broken down as several peoples fought for adequate land. Today, the remaining Illiniwek are part of a single tribe—the Peoria of Oklahoma.

European exploration and colonization
French explorers Jacques Marquette and Louis Jolliet explored the Mississippi and Illinois Rivers in 1673. As a result of their exploration, the Illinois Country was part of the French empire until 1763, when it passed to the British. The area was ceded to the new United States in 1783 and became part of the Northwest Territory.

American Territory
The Illinois-Wabash Company was an early claimant to much of Illinois. An early western outpost of the United States, Fort Dearborn, was established in 1803 (at the site of present-day Chicago), and the creation of the Illinois Territory followed on February 3, 1809.

Statehood
On December 3, 1818, Illinois became the 21st U.S. state. Early U.S. expansion began in the south part of the state and quickly spread northward, driving out the native residents. In 1832, some Native American "Indians" returned from Iowa but were driven out in the  Black Hawk War, fought by militia.

Illinois is known as the "Land of Lincoln" because it is here that the 16th President spent his formative years. Chicago gained prominence as a lake and canal port after 1848, and as a rail hub soon afterward. By 1857, Chicago was the state's dominant metropolis. (see History of Chicago).

Slavery
The state has a varied history in relation to slavery and the treatment of African Americans  in general. The French had black slaves from 1719 to as late as the 1820s. Slavery was nominally banned by the Northwest Ordinance, but that was not enforced. But when Illinois became a sovereign state in 1818, the Ordinance no longer applied, and there were about 900 slaves there. As the southern part of the state, known as "Egypt", was largely settled by migrants from the South, the section was hostile to free blacks and allowed settlers to bring slaves with them for labor. Proslavery elements tried to call a convention to legalize slavery, but they were blocked by Governor Edward Coles who mobilized anti-slavery forces, warning that rich slave owners would buy up all the good farm lands. A referendum in 1823 showed 60% of the voters opposed slavery, so efforts to make slavery official failed. Nevertheless, some slaves were brought in seasonally or as house servants as late as the 1840s. The Illinois Constitution of 1848 was written with a provision for exclusionary laws to be passed. In 1853, state senator John A. Logan helped pass a law to prohibit all African Americans, including freedmen, from settling in the state. After 1865 Logan reversed positions and became a leading advocate of civil rights for blacks.

Latter Day Saints at Nauvoo

In 1839, members of the Church of Jesus Christ of Latter Day Saints, often referred to as Mormons, created a settlement they named Nauvoo.  By 1840 church leadership envisioned Nauvoo as an economic, cultural and spiritual center—a religious utopia guided by church leaders. The city, situated on a prominent bend along the Mississippi River, quickly grew to 12,000 inhabitants, and was for a time rivaling for the title of largest city in Illinois.  By the early 1840s, the Latter Day Saints built a large stone temple in Nauvoo, one of the largest buildings in Illinois at the time, which was completed in 1846. In 1844 Joseph Smith, the founder of the Latter Day Saint movement, was killed in nearby Carthage, Illinois. In 1846, the Latter-day Saints under Brigham Young left Illinois for what would become Utah, but what was still then Mexican territory. A small breakaway group remained, but Nauvoo fell largely into abandonment. Nauvoo today has many restored buildings from the 1840s.

American Civil War

During the Civil War, over 250,000 soldiers from Illinois served in the Union Army, the fourth most by state. Starting with President Lincoln's first call for troops and continuing throughout the war, Illinois sent 150 infantry regiments; they were numbered from the 7th IL to the 156th IL. Seventeen cavalry regiments also served as well as two light artillery regiments. The most well worked soldier was Ulysses S. Grant of Galena. Throughout the war the Republicans were in control, under the firm leadership of Governor Richard Yates The Democrats had a strong Copperhead element that opposed the war and tried in local areas to disrupt the draft. In Chicago, Wilbur F. Storey made his Democratic newspaper the Chicago Times into Lincoln's most vituperative enemy.

20th century
In the 20th century, Illinois emerged as one of the most important states in the Union. Edward F. Dunne was a Chicago Democrat and leader of the progressive movement, who served as governor 1913–1917. He was succeeded by Frank O. Lowden, who led the war effort and was Republican presidential hopeful in 1920.

Democrat Adlai Stevenson served as governor in 1948–1952. William G. Stratton led a Republican statehouse in the 1950s. In 1960 Otto Kerner Jr. led the Democrats back to power. He promoted economic development, education, mental health services, and equal access to jobs and housing. In a federal trial in 1973, Kerner was convicted on 17 counts of bribery while he was governor, plus other charges; he went to prison. Richard B. Ogilvie, a Republican, won in 1968. Bolstered by large Republican majorities in the state house, Ogilvie embarked upon a major modernization of state government. He successfully advocated for a state constitutional convention, increased social spending, and secured Illinois' first state income tax. The latter was particularly unpopular with the electorate, and the modest Ogilvie lost a close election to the flashy Democrat Dan Walker in 1972.
The state constitutional convention of 1970 wrote a new document that was approved by the voters. It modernized government and ended the old system of three-person districts which froze the political system in place.

Walker did not repeal the income tax that Ogilvie had enacted and wedged between machine Democrats and Republicans had little success with the Illinois legislature during his tenure. In 1987 he was convicted of business crimes not related to his governorship. In the 1976 gubernatorial election, Jim Thompson, a Republican prosecutor from Chicago won 65 percent of the vote over Michael Howlett. Thompson was reelected in 1978 with 60 percent of the vote, defeating State Superintendent Michael Bakalis. Thompson was very narrowly reelected in 1982 against former U.S. Senator Adlai E. Stevenson III, and then won decisively against him in a rematch in 1986.

Thompson was succeeded by Republican Jim Edgar who won a close race in 1990 against his Democratic opponent, attorney general Neil Hartigan, and was reelected in 1994 by a wide margin against another Democratic opponent, state comptroller and former state senator Dawn Clark Netsch. In the elections of 1992 and 1994, the Republicans succeeded in capturing both houses of the state legislature and all statewide offices, putting Edgar in a very strong political position. He advocated increases in funding for education along with cuts in government employment, spending and welfare programs. He was succeeded by yet another Republican, George H. Ryan. Ryan worked for extensive repairs of the Illinois Highway System called "Illinois FIRST". FIRST was an acronym for "Fund for Infrastructure, Roads, Schools, and Transit". Signed into law in May 1999, the law created a $6.3 billion package for use in school and transportation projects. With various matching funds programs, Illinois FIRST provided $2.2 billion for schools, $4.1 billion for public transportation, another $4.1 billion for roads, and $1.6 billion for other projects. In 1993 Illinois became the first Midwestern state to elect a black person to the US senate before the term of Carol Moseley Braun. The 1996 Democratic National Convention hosted in Chicago sparked protests, such as the one whereby Civil Rights Movement historian Randy Kryn and 10 others were arrested by the Federal Protective Service.

21st century
Ryan gained national attention in January 2003 when he commuted the sentences of everyone on or waiting to be sent to death row in Illinois—a total of 167 convicts—due to his belief that the death penalty was incapable of being administered fairly. Ryan's term was marked by scandals; he was convicted of corruption in federal court and sent to prison.

Rod Blagojevich, elected in 2002, was the first Democratic governor in a quarter century. Illinois was trending sharply toward the Democratic party in both national and state elections. After the 2002 elections, Democrats had control of the House, Senate, and all but one statewide office. Blagojevich signed numerous pieces of progressive legislation such as ethics reform, death penalty reform, a state Earned Income Tax Credit, and expansions of health programs like KidCare and FamilyCare. Blagojevich signed a bill in 2005 that prohibited discrimination based on sexual orientation in employment, housing, public accommodations, and credit. Other notable actions of his term include a strict new ethics law and a comprehensive death penalty reform bill. Despite an annual budget crunch, Blagojevich oversaw an increase in funding for health care every year without raising general sales or income taxes. Republicans claimed that he simply passed the state's fiscal problems on to future generations by borrowing to balance budgets. Indeed, the 2005 state budget called for paying the bills by shorting the state employees' pension fund by $1.2 billion, which led to a backlash among educators. In December 2008, Blagojevich was arrested on charges of conspiracy and solicitation to commit bribery with regard to appointing a U.S. Senator. He was convicted in federal court and sent to prison.

Financial crisis
Pat Quinn became governor on January 29, 2009, after Blagojevich was removed from office. Quinn was elected to a full term in office in the 2010 gubernatorial election. As governor he faced severe short-term budget shortfalls and a long-term state debt, all in the context of the worst national economic slump since the Great Depression of the 1930s. Quinn has pushed for spending cuts and tax increases, while trying to raise ethical standards, protect public-sector labor unions, and maintain environmental standards. Quinn faced a state with a reputation for corruption—the two previous governors both went to federal prison—and after two years polls showed Quinn himself was the "Nation's most unpopular governor." Quinn in 2012 feared Illinois was "on the verge of a financial meltdown because of pension systems eating up every new dollar and health care costs climbing through the roof." The state for decades had underfunded its pension system for state employees. By early 2013 the main issue remained a financial crisis in meeting the state's budget and its long-term debt as the national economic slump—the Great Recession—continued and Illinois did poorly in terms of creating jobs. In May 2013, Illinois' state (public) universities, colleges, and community colleges agreed, pending formation and passage of the legislation before the end of the state's legislative session, at Illinois House Speaker Michael Madigan and other members' repeated urging, to gradually assume more of the burden- half of a percent of the retirement and pension costs per fiscal year starting in 2015 (it would likely take roughly 10 to 20 years for them to assume the full cost; school districts likely will have to do the same at some point- Chicago Public Schools already bear the entire cost). Programs will likely be cut, tuition will probably keep on being raised too, and property taxes also might well increase, but it would make a sizable dent in the almost $100 billion unfunded retiree pension liability that is a large part of the state's fiscal crisis.

Famous people
Most pre-1940 names have been selected from the WPA Guide This is a list of people from Illinois; people are not included if they left the state before beginning a career.

Before 1940
 Jane Addams, social work
 Philip D. Armour, business
 Louis Armstrong, music
 Edward Beecher, religion
 Lydia Moss Bradley, philanthropy
 Daniel H. Burnham, architect
 Joseph Gurney Cannon, politics, GOP
 Anton Cermak, politics, Dem
 John Coughlin, politics, Dem
 Clarence Darrow, law
 John Dewey, philosophy
 Stephen A. Douglas, politics, Dem
 Finley Peter Dunne, author
 Ninian Edwards, politics
 James T. Farrell, author
 Theodore Dreiser, author
 Eugene Field, author
 Marshall Field I, business
 Marshall Field III, business
 Thomas Ford, politics, Dem
 John T. Frederick, literature
 Lyman J. Gage, business
 Ulysses S. Grant, military
 Red Grange, sports
 Frank W. Gunsaulus, education
 William Rainey Harper, education
 Carter Harrison Sr., politics, Dem
 Carter Harrison Jr., politics, Dem
 George Peter Alexander Healy, artist
 Ben Hecht, author
 William Holabird, architect
 Raymond Hood, architect
 Henry Horner, politics, Dem
 Robert Maynard Hutchins, education
 Robert Ingersoll, religion
 Samuel Insull, business
 William Le Baron Jenney, architect
 Leslie Keeley, medicine
 Florence Kelley, social work
 John Kinzie, settler
 Frank Knox, newspapers
 Christian C. Kohlsaat, judge
 H. H. Kohlsaat, editor and publisher of the Chicago Times Herald
 René-Robert Cavelier, Sieur de La Salle, explorer
 Julia C. Lathrop, social work
 Victor F. Lawson, newspapers
 Abraham Lincoln, politics, Whig, GOP, 16th President of the United States
 Mary Todd Lincoln, Lincoln's wife
 Robert Todd Lincoln, Lincoln's son
 Vachel Lindsay, author
 John A. Logan, politics, Dem, GOP
 Frank O. Lowden, politics, GOP
 Cyrus Hall McCormick, business
 Robert R. McCormick, newspapers
 James Robert Mann, politics, GOP
 Edgar Lee Masters, author
 Joseph Medill, newspapers
 Charles E. Merriam, education
 Harriet Monroe, poet
 Dwight L. Moody, religion

 William Vaughn Moody, author
 George Mundelein, cardinal
 William Butler Ogden, business
 Richard James Oglesby, politics, GOP
 John M. Palmer, politics, GOP, Dem
 Potter Palmer, business
 Bertha Palmer, society
 Francis W. Parker, education
 John Mason Peck, author
 Jean Baptiste Point du Sable, settler
 George M. Pullman, business
 Henry T. Rainey, politics, Dem
 Ronald Reagan (1911–2004), 40th President of the United States, GOP
 John W. Root, architect
 Julius Rosenwald, business
 E. W. Scripps, newspapers
 Richard Warren Sears, business
 Albion W. Small, sociology
 Joseph Smith, religion
 John Spalding, religion
 Amos Alonzo Stagg, sports
 Ellen Gates Starr, social work
 Bernard James Sheil, religion
 Melville E. Stone, newspapers
 Adlai Stevenson, politics; Vice President, Dem
 Gustavus F. Swift, business
 Graham R. Taylor, social work
 Theodore Thomas, conductor
 Lyman Trumbull, politics, Dem, GOP, Dem
 Jonathan Baldwin Turner, education
 Charles Rudolph Walgreen, business
 A. Montgomery Ward, business
 John Wentworth, politics, Dem, GOP
 Frances E Willard, social activist, head of the Woman's Christian Temperance Union
 Frank Lloyd Wright, architect
 Richard Yates, politics, GOP
 Charles Yerkes, business
 Arnold Beckman, inventor and philanthropist

Recent
 Jackie Joyner-Kersee, Olympic Gold Medalist
 John Bardeen (1908–1991) winner of two Nobel prizes in physics
 Joseph Bernardin (1928–1996), cardinal
 Richard J. Daley (1902–1976), Chicago mayor; Dem
 Richard M. Daley (born 1942), Chicago mayor, son of Richard J.; Dem
 Everett Dirksen, politics, GOP
 Enrico Fermi, nuclear physics
 Vince Vaughn, actor
 Andrew Greeley (born 1928), author; religion; sociology
 George Halas, (1895–1983) sports
 Robert H. Michel, (born 1923), politics, GOP
 Ludwig Mies van der Rohe, architect
 William Shockley, (1910–1989), physicist invented transistor
 Adlai Stevenson II (1908–1965), politician, Dem
 Robert Berland, (born 1961) Summer Olympics 1984 Silver Medalist in Judo and 1988 Olympian
Eric Newby, (born 1988)
Summer Paralympics 2016 Silver Medalist in Wheelchair Rugby and 2020 [[Silver 
Medalist]] in Wheelchair Rugby

See also

 History of the Midwestern United States
 Women's suffrage in Illinois
 List of historical sites related to the Illinois labor movement

References

Further reading
 Adams, Jane. The Transformation of Rural Life: Southern Illinois, 1890–1990 (1994)
 Angle, Paul M. Here I Have Lived: A History of Lincoln's Springfield, 1821–1865 (1935)
 Baringer, William E. and Romaine Proctor. Lincoln's Vandalia, a Pioneer Portrait (1949)
 Barnard, Harry. "Eagle Forgotten": The Life of John Peter Altgeld (1938)
 Beveridge, Albert J. Abraham Lincoln, 1809–1858 (1928)
 Biles, Roger. Illinois: A History Of The Land And Its People (2005)
 Buck, Solon J. Illinois in 1818 (1917): online
 The Centennial History of Illinois a famous series by leading scholars; the copyright has expired and the books are in the public domain
 vol. 1. The Illinois Country 1673–1818 by Clarence Walworth Alvord. (1920)  online edition
 vol. 2. The Frontier State, 1818–1848 by Theodore Calvin Pease. (1919) online edition
 vol. 3. The Era of the Civil War 1848–1870 by Arthur Charles Cole (1919)
 vol. 4. The Industrial State 1870–1893 by Ernest Ludlow Bogart & Charles Manfred Thompson, (1920) online edition
 vol. 5. The Modern Commonwealth, 1893–1918 by Ernest Ludlow Bogart and John Mabry Mathews (1920) online edition
 Carr, Kay J. Belleville, Ottawa, and Galesburg: Community and Democracy on the Illinois Frontier (1996)
 Chapman, Margaret L. et al. Mitsubishi Motors in Illinois: Global Strategies, Local Impacts (1995)
 Davis, James E. Frontier Illinois (1998).
 Elazar, Daniel J. Cities of the Prairie Revisited (1986)
 Garland, John H. The North American Midwest: A Regional Geography (1955)
 Gjerde, Jon. The Minds of the West: Ethnocultural Evolution in the Rural Middle West, 1830–1917 (1997)
 Gove, Samuel K. and James D. Nowlan. Illinois Politics & Government: The Expanding Metropolitan Frontier (1996)
 Hallwas, John E. ed., Illinois Literature: The Nineteenth Century (1986)
 Hartley, Robert E. Big Jim Thompson of Illinois (1979), governor 1980s
 Hartley, Robert E. Paul Powell of Illinois: A Lifelong Democrat (1999)
 Hicken, Victor. Illinois in the Civil War (1966).
 Hoffmann, John. A Guide to the History of Illinois. (1991)
 Howard, Robert P. Illinois: A History of the Prairie State (1972).
 Howard, Robert P. Mostly Good and Competent Men: Illinois Governors 1818–1988 (1988)
 Hutchinson, William. Lowden of Illinois the Life of Frank O. Lowden 2 vol (1957) governor in 1917–21
 Jensen, Richard. Illinois: A History (2001). interpretive history using model of traditional-modern-postmodern
 Keating, Ann Durkin. "In the Shadow of Chicago: Postwar Illinois Historiography." Journal of the Illinois State Historical Society 111.1-2 (2018): 120-136 online.
 Keiser, John H. Building for the Centuries: Illinois 1865–1898 (1977)
 Kenney, David The Political Passage: The Career of Stratton of Illinois (1990). Governor in 1950s.
 Kinsley, Philip. The Chicago Tribune: Its First Hundred Years (1943)
 Kleppner, Paul. Political Atlas of Illinois (1988) maps for 1980s.
 Leonard, Gerald. The Invention of Party Politics: Federalism, Popular Sovereignty, and Constitutional Development in Jacksonian Illinois (2002)
 Littlewood, Thomas B. Horner of Illinois (1969), governor 1933–40
 Martin, John Bartlow. Adlai Stevenson of Illinois (1977). Governor 1948–52.
 Meyer, Douglas K. Making the Heartland Quilt: A Geographical History of Settlement and Migration in Early-Nineteenth-Century Illinois (2000)
 Miller, Kristie. Ruth Hanna Mccormick: A Life in Politics, 1880–1944 (1992)
 Morgan, M.J. Land of Big Rivers: French and Indian Illinois, 1699–1778 (Southern Illinois University Press; 2010) 288 pages; Examines the environmental history and settlement of the river plain along the Mississippi.
 Morton, Richard Allen. Justice and Humanity: Edward F. Dunne, Illinois Progressive (1997) governor 1913–17.
 Nardulli, Peter, ed.Diversity, Conflict, and State Politics: Regionalism in Illinois (1989)
 Peirce, Neal, and John Keefe. The Great Lakes States of America: People, Politics, and Power in the Five Great Lakes States (1990)
 Plummer, Mark A. Lincoln's Rail Splitter: Governor Richard J. Oglesby (2001) governor 1865–69, 1885–89
 Riddle, Donald W. Lincoln Runs for Congress (1948)
 Scott, David W., "The Transformation of Higher Education in the 1960s: Master Plans, Community Colleges, and Emerging Universities," Journal of the Illinois State Historical Society, 101 (Summer 2008), 177–92.
 Teaford, Jon C. Cities of the heartland: The rise and fall of the industrial Midwest (Indiana University Press, 1993). online; strong on Chicago and St Louis.

 WPA. Illinois: A Descriptive and Historical Guide (1939) online

Primary documents
 Johnson, Walter. Governor of Illinois 1949–1953 (Papers of Adlai E. Stevenson, Volume 3) (1973), primary documents.
 Peck, J. M. A Gazetteer of Illinois (1837), a primary source online
 Quaife, Milo Milton ed. Growing Up with Southern Illinois, 1820 to 1861: From the Memoirs of Daniel Harmon Brush (1944)
 Sutton, Robert P. ed. The Prairie State: A Documentary History of Illinois (1977).

External links
 "Illinois During the Gilded Age", primary sources
 Journal of the Illinois State Historical Society (1908-1984) issues in JSTOR
  Digital Research Library of Illinois History®
 ; Timeline of Illinois

 
Illinois